THAP domain-containing protein 4 is a protein that in humans is encoded by the THAP4 gene.

References

Further reading